Chopardiella is a genus of mantises belonging to the family Mantidae.

The species of this genus are found in Central America.

Species:

Chopardiella heterogamia 
Chopardiella latipennis 
Chopardiella poulaini

References

Mantidae